The Sitka Center for Art and Ecology, located in Otis, Oregon, United States, was established in 1970 as an entity of the Neskowin Coast Foundation, which was founded May 8, 1970. The Sitka Center was established to expand the relationships between art, ecology, and humanity.

The center offers workshops in writing, art, environmental studies and other avenues of creative inquiry, in a cluster of classrooms and studios within view of the Pacific Ocean. From September through May, the Sitka Center offers a residency program for artists, writers and scholars.

The center offers promising applicants a place to live and work, free of charge for up to four months; in return, the residents perform community outreach during their stay, including free exhibits and lectures on the Cascade Head Campus.

The Sitka Center was established by Jane and Frank Boyden.

The organization is a member of the Alliance of Artists Communities, which focuses on creating residency opportunities for artists all over the country.

Notable residents
Robin Cody
Robert Michael Pyle
Kim Stafford

See also
Neskowin, Oregon

References

External links
 The Sitka Center for Art and Ecology
 Alliance of Artists Communities
 Social Enterprise working in ecological art

Arts organizations based in Oregon
Non-profit organizations based in Oregon
Arts centers in Oregon
Education in Lincoln County, Oregon
Buildings and structures in Lincoln County, Oregon
Tourist attractions in Lincoln County, Oregon
1970 establishments in Oregon
Arts organizations established in 1970